Boglárka Dallos-Nyers (born 2 April 1997), better known as simply Bogi or Bogi Dallos, is a Hungarian singer, best known for participating in A Dal 2013, 2014 and 2015.

Career

2013–present: A Dal and breakthrough
On 10 January 2013, Bogi was announced as one of the thirty finalists for A Dal 2013 with her Hungarian language R&B song "Tükörkép" (Reflection). She competed in the first heat held on 2 February 2013, but did not receive enough jury or public votes to move on to the semi-finals and was eliminated.

On 11 December 2013, Bogi was announced once again to be one of the thirty competitors in A Dal 2014, this time with an English language indie pop song "We All". She competed in the second heat on 1 February 2014, and was one of the three jury qualifiers, advancing to the semi-finals. She competed in the first semi-final held on 15 February 2014, and once again achieved enough jury votes to become one of the jury qualifiers and advance to the final. In the final held on 22 February 2014, Bogi performed second. It was later announced she was one of the four contestants who received enough jury votes to move on to the top four, where the winner will be decided by public votes. Bogi did not win, but placed in the top four. She represented Hungary in the OGAE Second Chance Contest 2014 with "We All", placing fifteenth.

On 8 December 2014, it was announced that Bogi would take part in A Dal once again with the song "World of Violence". She participated in the first heat, and passed onto the semi-final courtesy of the jury vote, where she was eliminated.

Discography

Singles

References

Living people
Hungarian pop singers
People from Győr
21st-century Hungarian women singers
English-language singers from Hungary
1997 births